Wojaszówka  is a village in Krosno County, Subcarpathian Voivodeship, in south-eastern Poland. It is the seat of the gmina (administrative district) called Gmina Wojaszówka.

The village has a population of 700.

References

Villages in Krosno County